Montcalm Street is a QLine streetcar station in Detroit, Michigan. The station opened for service on May 12, 2017, and is located at the northern end of Downtown Detroit. During the planning stage the station was known as Foxtown.

Destinations
 St. John's Episcopal Church
 Comerica Park (home to the MLB's Tigers)
 Fox Theatre
 Fillmore Theatre
 Little Caesars Arena (home of the NHL's Red Wings and the NBA's Pistons)
 Ford Field (home to the NFL's Lions)
 Central United Methodist Church
 Grand Circus Park

Station
The station, in addition to Sproat Street/Adelaide Street neighboring it to the north, are sponsored by Ilitch Holdings. It is heated and features security cameras and emergency phones. Passenger amenities include Wi-Fi and arrival signs.

See also

Streetcars in North America

References

Tram stops of QLine
Railway stations in the United States opened in 2017